Double Double Whammy is an independent record label founded by Dave Benton and Mike Caridi in October 2011 whilst studying at SUNY Purchase, a liberal arts college in New York state.

History
Double Double Whammy was founded by Dave Benton and Mike Caridi in October 2011. The pair started releasing tapes for their own band LVL UP, and local bands at SUNY Purchase, the college they attended in New York state. They considered the label inspired by other indie rock labels such as Merge and K.

In 2014 Double Double Whammy released the breakout albums from Frankie Cosmos and fellow SUNY Purchase alumnus Mitski.

After college the label moved to Brooklyn. Benton left the label in the Fall of 2016, and it is now run by Caridi with Mallory Hawkins, who joined the label in January 2018.

In February 2018, Double Double Whammy and Polyvinyl Records announced a partnership moving forward. Through this partnership, Polyvinyl provides distribution, accounting, webstore fulfillment, and other shared services, while Double Double Whammy maintains creative autonomy.

In September 2018 Pitchfork described the label as largely releasing singer-songwriters that have "a knack for delivering devastating details with a quiet force" and that it has helped "shift the sound of indie rock/pop over the last few years".

Artists with releases on Double Double Whammy
2nd Grade
Babehoven
Bellows
Bread Pilot
Cende
Crying
Florist
Frankie Cosmos
Free Cake for Every Creature
Gabby's World
Gemma
The Glow
The Goodbye Party
Great Grandpa
Hatchie
Hovvdy
Lomelda
Long Beard
LVL UP
Mirah
Mitski
Quarterbacks
Radiator Hospital
Sean Henry
Skirts
Told Slant
Yowler

References 

Record labels established in 2011
American independent record labels